Zuzana Bydžovská (born 10 October 1961) is a Czech actress. She has performed in more than fifty films since 1973.

Selected filmography

Awards

References

External links
 

1961 births
Living people
Czech film actresses
Czech television actresses
People from Most (city)
21st-century Czech actresses
20th-century Czech actresses
Czech Lion Awards winners